David Field Beatty, 2nd Earl Beatty,  (22 February 1905 – 10 June 1972), styled Viscount Borodale from 1919 to 1936, was a Royal Navy officer and British Conservative Party politician.

Early life
Beatty was born on 22 February 1905. He was the eldest son of Admiral of the Fleet David Beatty, 1st Earl Beatty and his wife Ethel. He had one brother, Peter Beatty. From his mother's first marriage to Arthur Tree (a son of Lambert Tree), he had an elder half-brother, Ronald Tree, who served as MP for Harborough and friend of Winston Churchill. Ronald was married to Nancy Keene Field (née Perkins) (widow of his first cousin Henry Field) and Marietta FitzGerald (née Peabody), a granddaughter of the Rev. Endicott Peabody.

His maternal grandfather was the American businessman Marshall Field. His father was the second son of five children born to Captain David Longfield Beatty and Katherine Edith Beatty (née Sadleir), both from Ireland: David Longfield had been an officer in the Fourth Hussars where he formed a relationship with Katrine, the wife of another officer.

Beatty was educated at the Royal Naval College, Osborne, on the Isle of Wight, and the Royal Naval College, Dartmouth. In 1919, he gained the courtesy title of Viscount Borodale when his father was created Earl Beatty.

Career
In 1919, he gained the rank of midshipman in the service of the Royal Navy. He was promoted to the rank of lieutenant in 1928. He would later serve in the Leicestershire Yeomanry, part of the Territorial Army, and gained the rank of lieutenant in 1933.

Beatty, holding the rank of lieutenant commander, was awarded the Distinguished Service Cross in 1942.

Political career
From 1931 to 1936 he was the Member of Parliament (MP) for Peckham. His half-brother Ronald Tree also sat in Parliament at this time, as member for Market Harborough, Leicestershire. During his time in parliament he held the office of Parliamentary Private Secretary to the Parliamentary Secretary to the Admiralty from 1931 until 1936. He moved to the House of Lords when he succeeded as 2nd Earl Beatty on his father's death on 11 March 1936.

He also served as a member of the London County Council in 1937. In 1945, he served as Under-Secretary of State for Air in the Caretaker Government after the Second World War.

Personal life
Beatty was married four times, the first three times to Americans. His first marriage was to Dorothy Carlotta (née Power) Sands on 21 April 1937, an older sister of Thomas Sarsfield Power (later the United States Army Air Forces general to direct the dropping of the atomic bombs on Japan). David and Dorothy (who had previously been married to LaFrance Adelbert Mitchell, Harry Estie Reynolds Hall, and Edward Van Volkenburgh Sands) were divorced in 1945. She next married and divorced John Gordon Baragwanath and then, on 10 December 1954, she was married to Peregrine Francis Adelbert Cust, 6th Baron Brownlow, remaining married until her death in 1966.

On 7 February 1946, he remarried to Dorothy Rita (née Furey) Bragg (1918–2006), the widow of Sgt. Richard Edward Bragg RAF, and daughter of Michael James Furey of New Orleans, Louisiana. Between 1946 and 1950, she had an affair with Conservative Party leader Anthony Eden whilst he was separated from his wife. Before their divorce in 1950, they were the parents of one son:

 David Beatty, 3rd Earl Beatty (b. 1946), who married Anne Please in 1971. They divorced in 1982 and he married Anoma Corinne Wijewardene in 1984.

His third wife was Adelle (née Dillingham) O'Connor (d. 1990), the former wife of William V. O'Connor of Los Angeles, California and the daughter of M. Dillingham, of Oklahoma City. They married on 5 July 1951 and divorced in 1958 before having had one daughter:

 Lady Diana Beatty (b. 1952), who married Nicolas Gage, 8th Viscount Gage in 1974. They divorced in 2004.

After their divorce, Adelle married Stanley Donen in 1960.

His fourth wife was Diane Kirk Blundell, a daughter of John Rutherford Blundell of Hayling Island in Hampshire. She was one of the last generation of debutantes to be presented to the Queen, in 1958. They married on 3 December 1959 and remained married until his death. From his fourth marriage he had a son and a daughter:

 Hon. Nicholas Duncan Beatty (b. 1961), who married writer Laura Keen (b. 1963), a granddaughter of Edward Curzon, 6th Earl Howe and sister of actor Will Keen and poet Alice Oswald.
 Lady Miranda Katherine Beatty (b. 1963), who married Alan Stewart, youngest son of Sir Dugald Stewart of Appin in 1989. In 2000, she married Michael Hutchinson of Exminster.

Lord Beatty died on 10 June 1972 and was succeeded by his eldest son, David. After his death, Lady Beatty remarried to Sir John Nutting, 4th Baronet of Chicheley Hall, in 1973.

References

External links
The Peerage

 

1905 births
1972 deaths
David
British people of American descent
Conservative Party (UK) MPs for English constituencies
Earls in the Peerage of the United Kingdom
Leicestershire Yeomanry officers
Marshall Field family
Members of London County Council
Ministers in the Churchill caretaker government, 1945
UK MPs 1931–1935
UK MPs 1935–1945
UK MPs who inherited peerages